The White Lotus is an American black comedy-drama anthology television series created by Mike White for HBO. It follows the guests and employees of the fictional White Lotus resort chain whose stay is affected by their various psychosocial dysfunctions. The first season is set in Hawaii and the second season is set in Sicily.

Intended as a six-part limited series, The White Lotus premiered on July 11, 2021, to critical acclaim and high ratings. The show's success led to HBO renewing it as an anthology series; a second season premiered on October 30, 2022. In November 2022, the series was renewed for a third season.

The series received a positive critical response. It was included on the American Film Institute's list of the ten best programs of 2021 and 2022, and received various accolades including ten Primetime Emmy Awards, and two Golden Globes.

Premise
The series details "a week in the life of vacationers as they relax and rejuvenate in paradise. With each passing day, a darker complexity emerges in these picture-perfect travelers, the hotel's cheerful employees, and the idyllic locale itself."

Cast and characters

Season 1

Main

 Murray Bartlett as Armond, the manager of the White Lotus resort and a recovering drug addict who has been sober for five years
 Connie Britton as Nicole Mossbacher, a CFO of a search engine company
 Jennifer Coolidge as Tanya McQuoid, a troubled woman whose mother recently died and who seeks inner peace and discovery
 Alexandra Daddario as Rachel Patton, a newlywed struggling journalist who does clickbait gigs
 Fred Hechinger as Quinn Mossbacher, Nicole and Mark's socially awkward, screen-addicted teenage son
 Jake Lacy as Shane Patton, Rachel's husband, who is a demanding and entitled wealthy real estate agent
 Brittany O'Grady as Paula, Olivia's less privileged but equally caustic friend from college
 Natasha Rothwell as Belinda Lindsey, the resort's kindly spa manager, who develops a complicated relationship with Tanya
 Molly Shannon as Kitty Patton, Shane's overbearing mother, who pays for his honeymoon and makes a less than welcome unannounced visit
 Sydney Sweeney as Olivia Mossbacher, Nicole and Mark's sardonic daughter who is a college sophomore
 Steve Zahn as Mark Mossbacher, Nicole's husband who is dealing with a health crisis

Recurring
 Lukas Gage as Dillon, a staffer at the White Lotus
 Kekoa Scott Kekumano as Kai, a Native Hawaiian staffer at the White Lotus who forms a connection with Paula
 Jon Gries as Greg Hunt, a White Lotus guest who connects with Tanya
 Alec Merlino as Hutch, a waiter at the White Lotus

Guest
 Jolene Purdy as Lani, a trainee at the White Lotus who disguises her pregnancy

Season 2

Main
 F. Murray Abraham as Bert Di Grasso, Dominic's elderly, womanizing father
 Jennifer Coolidge as Tanya McQuoid-Hunt, reprising her role from the first season
 Adam DiMarco as Albie Di Grasso, Dominic's affable, socially awkward son, a recent Stanford graduate
 Meghann Fahy as Daphne Sullivan, Cameron's seemingly sweet but manipulative stay-at-home wife
 Beatrice Grannò as Mia, a local aspiring singer who resists her friend Lucia's attempts to introduce her to prostitution
 Jon Gries as Greg Hunt, Tanya's volatile husband, reprising his role from the first season
 Tom Hollander as Quentin, a wealthy gay English expat living in Sicily
 Sabrina Impacciatore as Valentina, the strict, no-nonsense manager of the White Lotus in Sicily
 Michael Imperioli as Dominic Di Grasso, a sex-addicted Hollywood producer traveling with his father Bert and son Albie
 Theo James as Cameron Sullivan, a cocky and scheming investments manager, Daphne's husband and Ethan's college friend
 Aubrey Plaza as Harper Spiller, a strait-laced employment lawyer, Ethan's wife
 Haley Lu Richardson as Portia, Tanya's rudderless young assistant whom she brings on her vacation
 Will Sharpe as Ethan Spiller, a newly wealthy tech entrepreneur, Harper's husband and Cameron's college friend
 Simona Tabasco as Lucia Greco, a local hustler and prostitute
 Leo Woodall as Jack, a charismatic young man from Essex, whom Quentin introduces as his "cheeky nephew"

Recurring
 Federico Ferrante as Rocco, a concierge at the White Lotus to whom Valentina has taken an inordinate dislike
 Eleonora Romandini as Isabella, a concierge at the White Lotus with a permanent smile
 Federico Scribani Rossi as Giuseppe, a lecherous middle-aged lounge singer and pianist at the White Lotus
 Francesco Zecca as Matteo, Quentin's friend
 Paolo Camilli as Hugo, Quentin's friend
 Bruno Gouery as Didier, Quentin's friend
 Nicola Di Pinto as Tommaso, the captain of Quentin's yacht

Guest
 Laura Dern as the voice of Abby, Dominic's estranged wife

Episodes

Season 1 (2021)

Season 2 (2022)

Production

Development

Season one
On October 19, 2020, HBO gave The White Lotus a limited series order that consisted of six episodes. The series was created, written and directed by Mike White. White also serves as executive producer alongside David Bernad and Nick Hall. In an interview with Ben Travers of IndieWire at the 2021 ATX Television Festival, White explained his creative inspiration for the first season. White wished to explore the question of "how money can pervert even our most intimate relationships," to examine the "ethics of vacationing in other people's realities," and to present the "flesh and blood" experience of being gripped by the power dynamics of "today's culture wars." Cristobal Tapia de Veer is the series' composer and Ben Kutchins is the cinematographer for the series.

Season two
On August 10, 2021, HBO renewed the series for a second season, which consists of seven episodes and is titled The White Lotus: Sicily. White initially envisioned the second season taking place in a political setting, such as a Bilderberg conference, but scrapped this idea and chose Italy instead.  White said regarding this choice, "The kind of mythology of Sicily, at least from the point of view of Americans, is the archetypal sexual politics and role play that you associate with, like, opera and the mafia and Italian romance. I felt like it should be more focused on men and women and relationships and adultery and have an operatic feel to it, so I pivoted." Asked to describe the second season, White likened it to "a bedroom farce with teeth." Kim Neundorf served as an additional composer for season two.

Season three
On November 18, 2022, HBO renewed the series for a third season. Following the season two finale, creator Mike White hinted that the third season would be set in Asia and invoke a "satirical and funny look at death and Eastern religion and spirituality", similar to how the first season focused on money, and the second season on sex.

Casting
Upon the limited series order announcement, Murray Bartlett, Connie Britton, Jennifer Coolidge, Alexandra Daddario, Fred Hechinger, Jake Lacy, Brittany O'Grady, Natasha Rothwell, Sydney Sweeney, and Steve Zahn were cast to star. On October 30, 2020, Molly Shannon, Jon Gries, Jolene Purdy, Kekoa Kekumano, and Lukas Gage joined the cast in recurring roles. Alec Merlino, who was a fellow contestant on Survivor: David vs. Goliath with Mike White, was cast as a waiter.

Upon the announcement of the second season renewal, it was reported that a predominantly new cast of characters would be focused on at another White Lotus property for the second season, though Mike White had stated there was a possibility for a few cast members from the first season to return as their characters. On October 15, 2021, it was reported that Coolidge was set to return for the second season. In January 2022, it was announced that Michael Imperioli, Aubrey Plaza, F. Murray Abraham, Adam DiMarco, Tom Hollander, and Haley Lu Richardson were cast to star in the second season. In February 2022, Theo James, Meghann Fahy, and Will Sharpe joined the cast as series regulars while Leo Woodall was cast in a recurring role for the second season. In March 2022, Beatrice Grannò, Sabrina Impacciatore, and Simona Tabasco joined the starring cast for the second season. The second season features White's fellow Survivor: David vs. Goliath contestants Kara Kay and Angelina Keeley in cameo roles.
Upon the third season renewal announcement, it was reported that there will be a new cast of characters on another White Lotus resort.

Filming
Principal photography for the first season began in October 2020 in Hawaii under COVID-19 guidelines. On November 21, 2020, it was reported that the series was halfway through filming at the Four Seasons Resort Maui at Wailea and was scheduled to film in December at locations around Maui. Zahn told The Hollywood Reporter that the Four Seasons was closed during filming, which resulted in a bubble for the cast and crew. Both he and Hechinger got PADI certified for the scuba scenes.

On January 20, 2022, it was announced that the second season would film at the Four Seasons  in Taormina, Sicily, Italy; on February 28, 2022, HBO confirmed that production had begun there. The opening theme of the second season, accompanied by a chorus of voices, shows scenes from the frescoes of Villa Tasca in Palermo. Filming took place in various locations in Sicily: throughout the city of Taormina, notably the San Domenico Palace hotel which represents the main location, and in the ancient theatre of Taormina; in Cefalù, with the long beach and the view of the Norman Cathedral; in Fiumefreddo di Sicilia (with the famous Slave Castle); in Palermo, in particular at the Teatro Massimo and at Villa Tasca; the interior scenes of the Opera house in Catania at the Teatro Massimo Bellini;  in the city of Noto, in particular Villa Elena; Giardini Naxos; and different views of the seafront of Sicily and Mount Etna.

Budget 
According to Vulture, the costs of production of season 2 remained at under  million per episode, the same as season 1. Italy, where season 2 was filmed, offers up to 40% tax credit to foreign productions taking place in the country.

Release
The series premiered on July 11, 2021, on HBO and HBO Max. In the United Kingdom and the Republic of Ireland, the series premiered on Sky Atlantic on August 16, 2021. The second season premiered on October 30, 2022.

Home media
The first season was released on DVD on September 13, 2022.

Reception

Critical response

Season 1 

Review aggregator Rotten Tomatoes reported an approval rating of 89% for the first season of The White Lotus based on 95 critic reviews, with an average rating of 8.4/10. The website's critics consensus reads, "Though its true intentions can get a bit murky, gorgeous vistas, twisty drama, and a pitch perfect cast make The White Lotus a compelling—if uncomfortable—viewing destination." On Metacritic, the season has a score of 82 out of 100 based on 39 critics, indicating "universal acclaim".

Matthew Jacobs of TV Guide rated it 4.5 out of 5 and wrote that it is "some of the year's best television thus far." Rolling Stones Alan Sepinwall graded it 3.5 out of 5 stars and called it "frequently uncomfortable, sometimes poetic, occasionally hilarious, and deeply idiosyncratic throughout." White's attention to character detail was praised, with Naomi Fry of The New Yorker lauding his "affection for his characters, who never feel like caricatures", and Judy Berman of Time commenting he is "uniquely attuned to characters' internal conflicts as well as their varying level of self-awareness."The New York Timess James Poniewozik commended White's signature balance of "sardonic and sincere" tones and his "ear for how people can weaponize idealism", though he also noted the writing "sometimes strains to be topical, with its culture-war Mad Libs references to triggering and cucking, canceling and doxxing." The performances of the ensemble cast were widely praised, with Roxana Hadadi of RogerEbert.com giving four stars out of four and writing it reveals a "combination of performances that are nearly universally enthralling." Of the character of Armond, Poniewozik wrote Bartlett shows "the invisible gymnastics that go into this job" and plays him like "a coiled spring." Hadadi lauded Rothwell's "nuanced, elastic work" with a "haunting" final onscreen moment. Berman said Coolidge is poised to be the series' breakout but also praised Zahn, Bartlett, Rothwell, Lacy, Sweeney, and Daddario.

Criticisms of the first season lamented that the nonwhite, native Hawaiian characters who work at the resort, such as Lani and Kai, received little screen time and were the least developed characters. In this way, critics argued the show did not sufficiently engage in the topics of imperialism and white privilege, issues the show seemed poised to critique in its satirization of the affluent, white upper class. Poniewozik felt the show "could use more attention to the downstairs half of its upstairs-downstairs story; it flicks at, but doesn’t really explore, the lives of the native Hawaiian staff busing tables and performing dinnertime rituals" for the guests. Mitchell Kuga of Vox wrote, "scraping at imperialism, The White Lotus mimes a moral center but never engages the topic beyond mere gesture...how successful can a piece of satire be if it replicates the very power structures it purports to satirize?" White has said the intention of giving native characters less screen time was to show how "interchangeable" the workers appear to the more privileged.

Inkoo Kang of The Washington Post said the characters and performances "make for a twisty, queasy, sweatily claustrophobic drama", but opined that next to other popular TV shows that center on white, affluent people, such as Succession, Big Little Lies, The Undoing, and The Crown, The White Lotus does not have anything new "to observe about the trail of casual destruction the moneyed and connected can leave in their unhappy wake." In The Observer, Kyle Turner wrote, "as someone who is very fond of White’s usually tender, deft hand at balancing tone", he hoped the show had "more precision in its aimed poisoned arrows." Turner added the show is "too broad to be a good satire, too pointedly critical to be a straight tragedy, too invested in its melodrama to be a broad comedy, until it becomes ouroborosian in its indecision on tone and ethos. It’s not that these genres and tropes can’t coexist. It’s that here, they float adrift, devoid of alchemical balance."

Critics were divided about the season one finale, with Kang saying the "swerve late in the series disappointingly sails the story toward calmer waters. Once the turbulence is over, only froth remains." Other critics, such as Emily St. James of Vox, argued that what they considered the anticlimactic nature of the ending was precisely the point of the show and underscored White's commentary on the powerful and the privileged.

The first season appeared in the top ten on numerous publications' "Best of 2021" lists, including first for The A.V. Club, The Globe and Mail, The Ringer, Slant Magazine, and The Sunday Times; second for The Boston Globe, Decider, Exclaim!, The Guardian, The Independent, New York Daily News, San Antonio Express-News, Sioux City Journal, Time, and Vulture; and third for Good Morning America, NME, and Uproxx, among others.

Season 2 
For the second season, Rotten Tomatoes reported a 94% approval rating with an average score of 8.20/10, based on 115 reviews. The website's critics consensus states, "Swapping its tropical trappings for Euro chic while focusing primarily on the corrosive influence of carnal desire, The White Lotus remains a cookie full of arsenic that goes down smooth." On Metacritic, the season has a score of 81 out of 100 based on 40 critics, indicating "universal acclaim".

Multiple critics voiced that White repeated the success of the first season with sharp writing, his ensemble cast, and more focused plot lines, with some saying it is an improvement on the first season. Lucy Mangan of The Guardian rated it 5 out of 5 and wrote, "The writing is as dense and layered as ever, the plotting is immaculate and the viewers' sympathies – or loathings – are never allowed to rest in one place for too long." Writing for The New Yorker, Inkoo Kang gave a positive review, writing "the airless sociological fatalism of Season 1, which was matched by a claustrophobic production due to covid-19 restrictions, gives way to a more mature drama, as well as a deeper exploration of how the characters’ class concerns converge with gendered angst." Brian Tallerico of RogerEbert.com wrote, "Mike White is a writer that is as thrilled with a fascinating dinner conversation as he is a murder mystery, and so even as the plotting sags more than it did the first time, the way that his characters bounce off each other, unpacking their social constructs, remains fascinating." Alison Herman of The Ringer praised the series' pivot to the theme of gender politics, writing "White knows that sex, like money, is a form of power, and that each is intimately bound up in the other." Melanie McFarland of Salon observed, "You may not want to be in the same room with the people you're watching, but the sights alone provided a level of escapism like nothing else on TV." For The Washington Post, Travis M. Andrews wrote "though these new episodes meander at times, Season 2 is more tightly plotted and there are enough new ideas, with even the most staid insights heightened by White’s razor-sharp writing, for it to feel fresh." Some critics welcomed the characters Mia and Lucia, two Sicilian sex workers whose plot lines intersect with many of the hotel guests', saying their presence felt like a response by White to criticisms of the previous season’s focus on its well-off leads. Others noted how the second season "has invested in horror imagery in a way the previous outing didn't, and it's been one of this installment's best through lines."

Others thought the shift from the themes of class criticism to gender roles made for a less riveting watch. Writing for Vulture, Roxana Hadadi said season two "centers infidelity, to diminished effect", and that "there’s also a new bluntness, and a noticeable tentativeness, that keeps this second season from hitting as hard and bruising as immediately as its predecessor." Vanity Fairs Richard Lawson wrote season two is a "vibrant set of plates to set spinning, which White does with his usual mix of acerbic bite and melancholy. Though, things do feel a little less pointed this season." Shirley Li of The Atlantic noted "Season 2 is as juicy as season 1, but it's not as caustic in its approach." Commenting on the more diminished role of the hotel staff, Linda Holmes of NPR wrote, "Thematically, without that tension between how the guests see themselves and how the staff sees them, The White Lotus seems adrift. With all the criticism of the first season and the fair questions about whether it was satirizing its rich and white characters' lack of interest in the people around them or just reproducing it, it was always clear what the show was trying to be about, or thought it was about. It was trying to be about the foibles of wealth and carelessness; it's much less clear where White is going with this story."

The second season appeared in the top ten on numerous publications' "Best of 2022" lists, including first for Good Morning America, The Independent, and San Antonio Express-News; second for the i; and third for Cleveland Plain-Dealer, Irish Independent, LA Weekly, Newsday, Radio Times, TV Insider, USA Today, and The Washington Post, among others.

Ratings

Season 1

Season 2

Accolades 

The first season received 11 nominations at the 2022 Primetime Emmy Awards across five categories, winning for each. It was also nominated for nine Primetime Creative Arts Emmy Awards across eight categories, winning five. It was the series that won the most Emmys across both ceremonies.

The series included in the American Film Institute Awards top ten Programs of the Year list for 2021 and 2022. Other nominations include three Critics' Choice Television Awards (winning all), five Golden Globe Awards (winning two), and a People's Choice Award.

References

External links
 
 

 
2020s American anthology television series
2020s American comedy-drama television series
2020s American LGBT-related comedy television series
2020s American LGBT-related drama television series
2020s American satirical television series
2020s American workplace comedy television series
2020s American workplace drama television series
2021 American television series debuts
English-language television shows
Gay-related television shows
HBO original programming
Primetime Emmy Award for Outstanding Miniseries winners
Primetime Emmy Award-winning television series
Television series about vacationing
Television series by Home Box Office
Television series created by Mike White
Television series impacted by the COVID-19 pandemic
Television series set in hotels
Television shows filmed in Hawaii
Television shows set in Hawaii
Television shows set in Italy